The medieval Irish office of erenagh (Old Irish: airchinnech, Modern Irish: airchinneach, Latin: princeps) was responsible for receiving parish revenue from tithes and rents, building and maintaining church property and overseeing the termonn lands that generated parish income. Thus he had a prebendary role.  The erenagh originally had a tonsure but took no other holy orders; he had a voice in the Chapter when they consulted about revenues, paid a yearly rent to the Bishop and a fine on the marriage of each daughter. The role usually passed down from generation to generation in certain families in each parish. After the Reformation and the Dissolution of the Monasteries the role of erenagh became subsumed in the responsibilities of the parson in each parish.

Surname
The common surname McInerney is derived from the Irish, Mac an Airchinnigh (son of the erenagh). As may be supposed, this surname arose in various areas in Ireland leading to numerous unrelated bearers of the name. The most prominent group of the family were associated with the County of Clare since at least the late 13th century when they were first recorded in the annals of the county and are still numerous in that county today. This sept was subordinate to the McNamaras and it was from them that the family originally derived. The McInerneys in County Clare were based in the Barony of Lower Bunratty on their ancestral estates in and around the present day townlands of Ballysallagh, Ballynacragga and Dromoland (parish of Kilnasoolagh). Members of the family held substantial property there until the Cromwellian confiscations of the 1650s, whereby several members of the family were transplanted to other areas of the County, in part due to their involvement in the 1641 rebellion. Today the name is numerous in County Clare, Limerick and Dublin, and can be found in the United States, Canada, Australia, England and New Zealand.

References

Christianity in medieval Ireland
Medieval occupations
Local Christian church officials
Religious leadership roles
Historical economic occupations
Historical management occupations